Chlebičov is a municipality and village in Opava District in the Moravian-Silesian Region of the Czech Republic. It has about 1,200 inhabitants. It is part of the historic Hlučín Region.

History
The first written mention of Chlebičov is from 1250. Since 1742 the village belonged to Prussia after Maria Theresa had been defeated. In 1920 it became a part of Czechoskovakia. Between 1979 and 1990 Chlebičov was an administrative part of Velké Hoštice, since 1990 it has been a separate municipality.

Twin towns – sister cities

Chlebičov is twinned with:
 Liptovské Revúce, Slovakia

References

External links

Villages in Opava District
Hlučín Region